Gertrude Prokosch Kurath (1903–1992) was an American dancer, researcher, author, and ethnomusicologist. She researched and wrote extensively on the study of dance, co-authoring several books and writing hundreds of articles. Her main areas of interest were ethnomusicology and dance ethnology, with some of her best known works being "Panorama of Dance Ethnology" in Current Anthropology (1960), the book Music and dance of the Tewa Pueblos co-written with Antonio Garcia (1970), and Iroquois Music and Dance: ceremonial arts of two Seneca Longhouses (1964), in the Smithsonian Institution Bureau of American Ethnology bulletin. She made substantial contributions to the study of Amerindian dance, and to dance theory. From 1958 to January 1972 she was dance editor for the journal Ethnomusicology.

Biography
Gertrude Prokosch was born on August 19, 1903, in Chicago, Illinois. She was the daughter of Eduard Prokosch, a historical linguist, and sister to the writer Frederic Prokosch. She graduated from Bryn Mawr College, receiving a BA in 1922, and an MA in art history in 1928, concurrently studying music and dance in Berlin, Philadelphia, New York, and Providence, Rhode Island from 1922 to 1928. She then studied music and dance at the Yale School of Drama at Yale University, from 1929 to 1930. She danced under the stage name of Tula, starting in 1922. From 1923 to 1946 she was a teacher, performer, producer, and choreographer of modern dance. In the mid-1940s, she turned her focus to the study of American Indian dance, doing extensive fieldwork on the musical traditions of Michigan's Anishinaabe and others. She was awarded grants for field research by the Wenner-Gren Foundation from 1949 to 1973, the American Philosophical Society from 1951 to 1965, and the National Museum of Canada (1962–1965, 1969–1970). She wrote about Iroquois, Pueblo, Six Nations, and Great Lakes Indian dances, as well as on the subjects of dance theory and methods. In 1962, she founded the Dance Research Center in Ann Arbor, Michigan.

Her other scholarly interests included the fields of folk liturgy and rock music. Robert Commanday of the San Francisco Chronicle praised her addition to The New Grove Dictionary of American Music, saying, "For the first time in the country's history, a comprehensive survey of its music and musicians is available in a single reference work. It encompasses the spectrum, the fields of concert, opera, traditional, folk and popular music, and areas related to and touching on American music in every conceivable way - industry, technology, education, religion, literature.... Two treatments must be singled out as unique and outstanding. One is the 20-page study on "Indians, American" by Bruno Nettl and Charlotte Heth on the music, Gertrude Kurath on the dance. In addition, there are separate articles on the music of nearly 40 tribes and tribal groups. Equally impressive is the 22-page article on 'European-American Music', treating in sequence the musical cultures and influences here of 19 European countries."

Kurath died on August 1, 1992, just a few months after the death of her husband, linguist Hans Kurath. Her archives are maintained at Cross-Cultural Dance Resources in Arizona, which published her work Half a Century of Dance Research. The Iroquois materials are housed in the Woodlands Cultural Centre in Brantford, Ontario.

Honors

 1972, CORD (Congress on Research in Dance)
 1986, UCLA Association of Graduate Dance Ethnologists
 1987, Society for Ethnomusicology
 2001, (posthumously), Society for Ethnomusicology
 2001, (posthumously) Michigan State University Museum Heritage Award

Selected works
 Kurath, Gertrude Prokosch; Garcia, Antonio. Music and Dance of the Tewa Pueblos, 1970
 Gertrude Prokosch Kurath / Jane Ettawageshik / Fred Ettawageshik / Michael D. McNally / Frank Ettawageshik, Sacred Music, Dance, and Myth of Michigan's Anishinaabe, 1946–1955
 Kurath, Gertrude Prokosch. Half a Century of Dance Research
 Helm, June, Nancy Oestreich Lurie, and Gertrude Prokosch Kurath. The Dogrib Hand Game. Ottawa: [Queen's Printer], 1966.
 
 
 "Panorama of Dance Ethnology" in Current Anthropology 1960, vol. 1, no. 3, pp. 233–254
Music and dance of the Tewa Pueblos with Antonio Garcia, Museum of New Mexico Press, Santa Fe, NM, 1970
"Iroquois Music and Dance: ceremonial arts of two Seneca Longhouses", Smithsonian Institution Bureau of American Ethnology bulletin 187, 1964
Recorded the Ethnic Folkways Library record Songs and Dances of Great Lakes Indians 1956, #FM 4003, Folkways Records & Services Corp.

References

Further reading
 Charlotte J. Frisbie, 1977, "Music and Dance Research of Southwestern United States Indians" Detroit Studies in Music Bibliography number 36. Information Coordinators, Inc. pp. 30–35.

External links
 Kurath Collection at CCDR (pdf)

 (A short Bio) https://web.archive.org/web/20120406063937/http://www.ccdr.org/kurath_bio.html

Dance historians
1903 births
1992 deaths
Writers from Chicago
Bryn Mawr College alumni
Yale School of Drama alumni
20th-century American historians